Leah Busque (born November 15, 1979), the founder of TaskRabbit, is an American entrepreneur.

The 2008-founded company was originally named RunMyErrand and was renamed in 2010.

Biography
Busque graduated from Sweet Briar College in 2001, earning a Bachelor of Science in Mathematics and Computer Science. She currently serves on the college's Board of Directors. Prior to RunMyErrand, Busque was an IBM Corp. engineer.

Busque lives in the San Francisco Bay Area with her husband and three children.

In an interview, she said that, based on "geeky conversations" with her ex-husband she "purchased the domain name Runmyerrand.com" and "Four months after that" left IBM "to build the first version of the site." When a chance to help the business grow required the family to relocate, they moved from Boston to San Francisco.

TaskRabbit

The company is  an online and mobile marketplace that connects clients with "Taskers" to outsource small jobs and tasks, like cleaning, deliveries, furniture assembly, and more to others in their neighborhood. From 2008 to 2016, Busque served as CEO of TaskRabbit. Over that time, she scaled the company to 44 cities and raised more than $50 million. In April 2016, Busque transitioned into the role of executive chairwoman. In September 2017, TaskRabbit was acquired by IKEA.

Entrepreneur
Since the summer of 2017, Busque has been a General Partner at FUEL Capital, where she invests in early-stage companies across consumer technology, hardware, education, marketplaces, and retail.

References

Living people
1979 births
American computer businesspeople
Sweet Briar College alumni
American women company founders
American company founders
21st-century American women